Blakes Hotel is a 5-star hotel in London, and considered one of the world's first boutique hotels. It is at 33 Roland Gardens in South Kensington. It was established by London hotelier and designer Anouska Hempel, and contains eclectic artifacts collected by Hempel during her international travels. Known for protecting its clients's privacy from the paparazzi, it often accommodates celebrities. Regular guests have included Princess Margaret; Sarah Ferguson, Duchess of York; actresses Gwyneth Paltrow and Lindsay Lohan; and supermodel Kate Moss..

The hotel is also home to a Mediterranean-style restaurant and an exclusive lounge named Blakes Below, which debuted in 2016.

The film was mentioned as a plot point in Sofia Coppola's 2020 film On the Rocks.

Interior
The hotel's 45 rooms were designed with varied influences; Asian, Moroccan and Colonial styles are conspicuous.

The single rooms contain French double beds with blacks and whites in an eclectic style. The double rooms are styled as Indenture or Provençal design, including antique swan beds. The Director's Double has European king-sized beds which are either French gilded antique swan or four-poster. The Luxury Suites, decorated in various styles, have European king-sized four-poster beds with extra high ceilings and their own balconies with French windows. The Library Suite has hidden cupboards behind fake bookshelves, silk wall hangings, and a double-height four-poster bed.

See also

References

External links
Official site

Hotels in London